Laura Piña Olmedo (born 31 December 1959) is a Mexican politician from the PRD. From 2006-2009 local and 2009 to 2012 federal she served as Deputy of the LXI Legislature of the Mexican Congress representing the Federal District.

References

1959 births
Living people
Politicians from Mexico City
Women members of the Chamber of Deputies (Mexico)
Members of the Chamber of Deputies (Mexico)
Ecologist Green Party of Mexico politicians
21st-century Mexican politicians
21st-century Mexican women politicians
Deputies of the LXI Legislature of Mexico